Cederström is a Swedish surname. Notable people with the surname include:

Gustaf Cederström, Swedish painter
Carl Gustav Cederström, Swedish pilot
Jacob Cederström (1817-1833), Gotland Governor in Sweden
Carl Cederström (1766-1781), Dalarna Governor in Sweden
Sven Cederström (1769-1775), Älvsborg County
Rudolf Cederström, Swedish admiral, acting Over-Governor of Stockholm (1816-1818)
Bror Cederström (1775-1785) Österbotten County
Gustaf Albrekt Bror Cederström (d. 1877) 
Bror Cederström (1780-1877), Minister for Defence in Sweden
Gary Cederstrom (born 1955), American baseball umpire

Swedish-language surnames